Kreso Kovacec (born 20 July 1969 in Krapina) is a German retired professional footballer who played as a forward. He also holds Croatian citizenship. He spent three seasons in the Bundesliga with FC Hansa Rostock.

Career statistics

References

External links 
 

1969 births
Living people
People from Krapina
German people of Croatian descent
German footballers
Association football forwards
Bundesliga players
2. Bundesliga players
VfL Bochum players
VfL Bochum II players
SC Concordia von 1907 players
Hannover 96 players
Tennis Borussia Berlin players
FC Hansa Rostock players
FC Augsburg players
SV Elversberg players